Baaj Adebule (born 25 October 1988) is a Nigerian actor, model, and filmmaker from Ogun State in Southwestern Nigeria.

He has appeared in Nollywood films since 2012. He began his career on M-Net's soap opera Tinsel and appeared in movies and TV series such as Hush, The Men's Club, Payday, Zena, Uncloaked, The Governor, The Missing, A Soldier's Story 1 & 2, Omo Wa, Beast Within, and The Moles.

Early life 
Adebule was born in Jalupon Hospital in Surulere, Lagos. He spent most of his childhood in Maryland Lagos, where he attended Seat of Wisdom primary school and Caleb secondary school. He moved to Surulere following his parents' divorce in 2005. Adebule is of Yoruba descent and is a native of the Ijebu Ode local government area of Ogun State. He was brought up in a Christian home. His father is a mechanical engineer and his mother is an accountant and entrepreneur. He is the youngest of nine children from several marriages.

His school years were focused on academics, as his parents emphasized the importance of a formal education. At a young age, he focused on sports and arts, playing football, basketball, badminton, table tennis, and track.

In his biography, Adebule stated he was a member of the local church choir from a young age as well as a member of his school's art club. Adebule was especially known for his love of movies, which he focused on following his parents' divorce.

In 2005, Adebule began attending Covenant University in Ogun State to study economics. He graduated with a second-class upper in 2009. After graduating, he was engaged in arts and sports. He worked in Multi Choice for almost two years before eventually quitting to focus on entertainment.

Career 
Adebule started his acting and modeling career in 2010 while working a nine-to-five job. He would go for auditions and photoshoots in his free time. He eventually got a small stint on the telenovela Tinsel.

With the support of his friends and family, he was a contestant in the 2011 Mr. Nigeria pageant, where he came 4th. In 2012, he began acting and modelling full-time.

Adebule got cast in multiple TV series, including Secrets and Scandals, Happy Family, Shola Shobowale, Victor Olaotan, and others.

By 2014, Adebule was starring in films and TV series such as Four Crooks and Rookie, Deadline, Studio, and Lekki Wives.

He made his first big-screen debut in 2015 in action movie A Soldier's Story, as well as the critically acclaimed Road to Yesterday.  Also in that year, he launched his production company House of Baaj Pictures. His first production was Seeing Betrayal, which he wrote and directed went on to win the best short film in Africa 2015 at the Zafaa Global Awards.

Adebule starred in Hush, portraying Adze. He starred in productions like 5ive, The Governor, Uncloaked, The Missing, Payday, and Battleground Showdown.

Filmography 

Unreleased

Awards and nominations

References

External links 
 

Living people
Male actors from Ogun State
Nigerian film directors
Covenant University alumni
1988 births
21st-century Nigerian male actors
Nigerian male television actors
Yoruba male actors